Marta Hoepffner (1912–2000) was a German artist and photographer. She studied at the Städelschule under Willi Baumeister and participated at the New Frankfurt-project.

1912 births
2000 deaths
Photographers from Frankfurt
German women photographers